The European route E8 is a European route that goes from Tromsø, Norway to Turku, Finland.

 E8: Tromsø – Nordkjosbotn – Skibotn – Kilpisjärvi – Kaaresuvanto – Muonio – Tornio – Keminmaa – Kemi – Oulu – Liminka – Raahe – Kalajoki – Kokkola – Vaasa – Pori – Rauma – Turku

History 
In the older E-road system that was used from 1950 to 1985 (in the Nordic countries until 1992), the E8 went London – Colchester – Harwich – ferry connection – Hook of Holland – The Hague – Utrecht – Oeynhausen – Hanover – Berlin – Poznań – Krośniewice – Łowicz – Warsaw – USSR border (Brest). It connected with E1, E2, E5, E31, E107, E108 and E113 routes.

The current E8 route was introduced in early 1990s  between Tromsø and Tornio and extended from Tornio to Turku in 2001. In the older E road system it had been called E78 since 1962.

Route 

: Tromsøya - Nordkjosbotn - Skibotn

: Kilpisjärvi - Karesuvanto - Tornio
: Tornio - Kemi
: Kemi - Oulu
: Oulu - Vaasa - Pori - Turku

References

External links 
 UN Economic Commission for Europe: Overall Map of E-road Network (2007)
 
 

08
E0008
European route E0008
Roads within the Arctic Circle